Madison Square Garden is a sports and entertainment venue in New York City.

Madison Square Garden may also refer to:

Former iterations of the arena
Madison Square Garden (1879)
Madison Square Garden (1890)
Madison Square Garden (1925)

Brands and enterprises
Madison Square Garden Sports, owner of the New York Knicks, New York Rangers, and other sports teams
Madison Square Garden Entertainment, owner of Madison Square Garden and other entertainment properties

Arts, entertainment, and media
Madison Square Garden (film), a 1932 American Pre-Code drama film
MSG (TV network), a cable and satellite TV network originally known as Madison Square Garden Network
MSG Plus, its sister station
USA Network, known as the Madison Square Garden Sports Network from 1977 to 1980

Other uses
Boston Garden, a former arena in Boston, Massachusetts, originally named "Boston Madison Square Garden"
Madison Square Garden Bowl, a former outdoor arena in Queens, New York
Madison Square Garden Towers, a never-built pair of skyscrapers proposed near Madison Square Garden
New York Coliseum, originally known as the "Madison Square Garden Annex" in planning stages

See also
MSG (disambiguation)